El Dabaa Nuclear Power Plant is the first nuclear power plant planned for Egypt and will be located at El Dabaa, Matrouh Governorate, Egypt, about 320 Kilometers northwest of Cairo. The plant will have four VVER-1200 reactors, making Egypt the only country in the region to have a Generation III+ reactor.

History
On November 19, 2015 Egypt and Russia signed an initial agreement, under which Russia will build and finance Egypt’s
first nuclear power plant. In December 2017 preliminary contracts for the construction of four VVER-1200 units were signed in the presence of Egyptian President Abdel Fattah el-Sisi and Russian President Vladimir Putin. Rosatom will build the plant, and supply Russian nuclear fuel for its entire life cycle.

The Nuclear Power Plants Authority (NPPA) submitted applications for construction permits for units 1 and 2 in June 2021, and applications for units 3 and 4 in December 2021. The permit for unit 1 was issued by the Egyptian Nuclear and Radiological Regulatory Authority (ENRRA) in June 2022. First safety-related concrete was poured in July 2022. In October 2022, ENRRA gave construction approval for unit 2, whose construction started on 19 November.

In 2022, Korea Hydro & Nuclear Power was contracted to construct 82 ancillary buildings and structures. Doosan Enerbility was sub-contracted to build the turbine buildings and related structures for about $1.2 billion.

Finance
The project will cost US$28.75 billion of which Russia will finance 85% as a state loan of US$25 billion and Egypt will provide the remaining 15% in the form of installments. The Russian loan has a repayment period of 22 years, with an annual interest rate of 3%.

Reactor data

See also

 Nuclear program of Egypt
 Egyptian Atomic Energy Authority
 Energy in Egypt

References 

Nuclear power stations in Egypt
Nuclear power stations with reactors under construction
Nuclear power stations using VVER reactors
Nuclear program of Egypt
Nuclear power in Egypt
Egypt–Russia relations